Cleisostoma recurvum is a species of orchid found in Cambodia, Laos, Thailand, Vietnam and China.

References

recurvum
Orchids of Cambodia
Orchids of China
Orchids of Laos
Orchids of Thailand
Orchids of Vietnam